Achila may refer to:

Achila, Bohol, village in the Philippines
Achila II, king of the Visigoths
Agila, also called Achila I, king of the Visigoths